Jason Whitaker (born June 19, 1977) is a former American football offensive guard who played college football at Florida State University and attended A. Crawford Mosley High School in Lynn Haven, Florida. He was a consensus All-American in 1999.

Biography

Early years
Whitaker played high school football for the A. Crawford Mosley High School Dolphins. He was a second-team All-South selection and rated as the fourth best offensive tackle in Florida by The Florida Times-Union.

College career
Whitaker played college football for the Florida State Seminoles. He was redshirted in 1995. He was a second-team All-Atlantic Coast Conference selection in 1997. He was named an All-American by the Football Writers Association of America in 1998 and was a third-team Associated Press All-American. Whitaker was also named first-team All-ACC and selected as a member of the All-ACC Academic team in 1998. He was a first-team consensus All-American and a first-team All-ACC selection in 1999.

References

Living people
1977 births
Place of birth missing (living people)
American football offensive guards
Florida State Seminoles football players
All-American college football players
People from Bay County, Florida
Players of American football from Florida